Franca Florio, regina di Palermo is a full-length narrative ballet in two acts, with music by Lorenzo Ferrero and scenario, choreography and staging by Luciano Cannito. A commission by the Teatro Massimo in Palermo, the work premiered there on 22 November 2007 with Carla Fracci in the title role, and was restaged in June 2010.

Set in Sicily, the story is based on the life of Franca Jacona Notarbartolo di San Giuliano (1873-1950), a famous Sicilian aristocrat whose beauty inspired many artists, musicians, and poets during the Belle Époque, who retraces the highlights of her life from her retreat on the island of Favignana. Her past is explored chronologically, by means of extensive flashbacks of events. The Florio's story, replete with worldly success but also with tragic events, is in part the metaphor of the failure of the industrial development in Sicily at the beginning of the twentieth century.

Roles
The ballet employs a large corps de ballet and the lead, solo and minor roles are numerous.

The Florio family:
Franca Florio; Ignazio Florio, Jr; Giovanna Florio, their daughter; the mother of Ignazio.

The Florios' guests:
Wilhelm II, German Emperor; Empress Augusta Victoria; King Edward VII of England; Queen Alexandra; Russian prince; Russian princess.

Other characters:
Vera Arrivabene; Giovanni Boldini; Colombina; the mother, father, and the cousins of Franca.

Foreign aristocrats, priest, personal assistants, butler, servants, fishermen, children, croupiers, men and women at the Casino.

Source:

Synopsis and structure
List of acts and musical numbers, with their synopsis:

See also
 List of historical ballet characters
 Giovanni Boldini
 Wilhelm II, German Emperor
 Augusta Victoria of Schleswig-Holstein
 Edward VII

References
Notes

Sources
 Cancila, Orazio. (2008). I Florio: Storia di una dinastia imprenditoriale siciliana. Rome: Bompiani. 
 Teatro Massimo website
 Casa Ricordi presentation

External links
 Casa Ricordi catalogue
 Franca Florio excerpt on YouTube, Act II, Scene 2 
 Franca Florio excerpt on YouTube, Act II, Scene 10

Ballets by Lorenzo Ferrero
2007 ballet premieres
Ballets based on actual events
Cultural depictions of Italian women
Cultural depictions of socialites
 Florio family
Belle Époque